Cathedral of Elijah the Prophet is a Greek Orthodox church in Jdeydeh quarter of Aleppo, Syria. The church belongs the Greek Orthodox Prelacy, the Diocese of Aleppo. It was consecrated in December 2000 as the new Greek Cathedral in Aleppo.

Design
The cathedral is a brick church, with a two-tower facade, topped with a dome.

History
The Cathedral of Elijah the Prophet was built in the late 20th century and consecrated on December 17, 2000. It replaced the historic Church of the Dormition of Our Lady as the Greek Cathedral for the city. With its consecration it became the new cathedral of the Greek Orthodox diocese of Aleppo.

In April 2013 during the Syrian civil war, the Greek Orthodox Archbishop Paul (Yazigi), who resided in the cathedral, was kidnapped together with the Syrian Orthodox Archbishop Gregorios Yohanna Ibrahim by forces allegedly loyal to the Islamic State of Iraq and the Levant. The two clergymen have not appeared since then, and the Greek Orthodox Cathedral of the Prophet Elijah has been without an archbishop since 2013. In the End of 2021 eventually Bishop Ephraim Maalouli was appointed as new archbishop.

See also
List of churches in Aleppo

References

Cathedrals in Aleppo
Eastern Orthodox church buildings in Syria
Churches completed in 2000
Greek Orthodoxy in Syria
Jdeydeh quarter
Church buildings with domes
Greek Orthodox cathedrals in Asia